Dan August is an American drama series that aired on ABC from September 23, 1970, to April 8, 1971. Burt Reynolds played the title character. Reruns of the series aired in prime time on CBS from May to October 1973 and from April to June 1975.

Premise
Police lieutenant Dan August investigates homicide cases in his (fictional) hometown of Santa Luisa, California. (The town is supposedly based on Santa Barbara, California but was filmed in Oxnard in Ventura County.)

Cast
Reynolds stars as police lieutenant Dan August. Other cast members include:

 Norman Fell as Sergeant Charles Wilentz, August's partner
 Richard Anderson as Police Chief Untermeyer
 Ned Romero as Sergeant Joe Rivera
 Ena Hartman as Katie Grant

Barney Phillips had a recurring role as Mike Golden, the medical examiner. John Lasell also had a recurring role as Benjamin Wedlock.

Guest stars
Guest stars including Diana Muldaur in the pilot episode "Murder by Proxy"; Martin Sheen in "Dead Witness to a Killing"; Dabney Coleman in "The King Is Dead"; Larry Hagman in "The Law"; John Ritter in "Quadrangle of Death"; and Harrison Ford, Billy Dee Williams, Mickey Rooney, David Soul and Gary Busey in "The Manufactured Man". Ahna Capri played Linda Perry in "Death Chain" and "Prognosis: Homicide".

Other guest actors to appear on the show include Michael Ontkean, Joan Hackett, Vera Miles, Annette O'Toole, Gary Collins, Ricardo Montalbán, Ford Rainey, Carolyn Jones, Fritz Weaver, John Marley, Janice Rule, Alexandra Hay, Norman Alden, Joan Van Ark, Bradford Dillman, Geraldine Brooks, Donna Mills, Victor French, Richard Basehart, Sherry Lansing, Monte Markham, Jan-Michael Vincent, Stephen Collins, Laurence Luckinbill, Lee Meriwether, Sal Mineo, Anna Navarro, Richard O'Brien, Fernando Lamas, Ellen Corby, Susan Oliver, John Beck, Michael Pataki, Diana Hyland and Simon Scott.

Episodes

Production
Reynolds later recalled "I swore I'd never play a cop on TV because you can't make jokes or have a broad. You wind up loving your car a lot. I was halfway out the door when Quinn said the magic words – $15,000 a week."

The series was based on Quinn Martin's 1970 TV movie House on Greenapple Road, starring Janet Leigh, which was based on Harold R. Daniels' 1966 mystery novel of the same name. It was directed by Robert Day from a script by George Eckstein. Christopher George played Dan August, with Keenan Wynn as Sergeant Wilentz and Barry Sullivan as Chief Untermeyer. Ned Romero was the only actor in the film who reprised his role in the series.

Reception and legacy 
While not initially popular enough to be renewed for a second season, Dan August became a fan favorite in reruns, particularly after Reynolds' popularity surged in the mid-1970s with his escalating movie career. CBS wisely re-aired the series both on The CBS Late Movie and in prime time during summer "rerun seasons" of both 1973 and 1975 to larger audiences.

Television films 
In 1980, a television movie titled Dan August: Once Is Never Enough aired on ABC in January 4. The film consisted of footage from episode 15, "Death Chain" and episode 25, "Prognosis: Homicide," cut together to television film length. At the time, ABC and Quinn Martin productions were looking to capitalize on the popularity of star Burt Reynolds, who was in the public eye due to Smokey and the Bandit.

Four further television films were produced, all of which comprised edits of existing episodes into film-length narratives. The Diana Muldaur and Dabney Coleman episodes ("Murder by Proxy" and "The King Is Dead") were edited into the second film Dan August: The Jealousy Factor, which aired later the same year on February 4, and was followed by three more complications of selected episodes Dan August: The Trouble with Women ("Epitaph for a Swinger" and "The Titan"), which aired on June 1, then Dan August: The Lady Killers ("When the Shouting Dies" and "The Worst Crime") and Dan August: Murder, My Friend ("Trackdown" and "Bullet for a Hero"), both which aired on November between 10 and 30 at the end of the 1980 television season respectively.

DVD release 
On December 7, 2018, Visual Entertainment released the complete series on DVD in Region 1.

References

External links

1970 American television series debuts
1971 American television series endings
CBS original programming
1970s American crime drama television series
American Broadcasting Company original programming
Television shows based on American novels
Television series by CBS Studios
Television shows set in Santa Barbara County, California
August, Dan
English-language television shows
American detective television series